The 2001 NCAA Division I-AA football season, part of college football in the United States organized by the National Collegiate Athletic Association (NCAA) at the Division I-AA level, began in August 2001, and concluded with the 2001 NCAA Division I-AA Football Championship Game on December 21, 2001, at Finley Stadium in Chattanooga, Tennessee. The Montana Grizzlies won their second I-AA championship, defeating the Furman Paladins by a score of 13–6.

Conference changes and new programs

Conference standings

Conference champions

Postseason

NCAA Division I-AA playoff bracket
The top four teams in the tournament were seeded; seeded teams were assured of hosting games in the first two rounds.

* By team name denotes host institution

* By score denotes overtime

References